Lois Bellman [Balchunas] (September 11, 1926 – October 17, 2015) was an All-American Girls Professional Baseball League player. Bellman batted and threw right handed. She was dubbed Punky.

Born in Chicago, Illinois, Bellman joined the league with the Chicago Colleens club in its 1949 season. She did not have individual records or some information was incomplete.

Sources
All-American Girls Professional Baseball League – Lois Balchunas. Retrieved 2019-03-26.
Madden, W. C. (2000) All-American Girls Professional Baseball League Record Book. McFarland & Company. 
Madden, W. C. (2005) The Women of the All-American Girls Professional Baseball League: A Biographical Dictionary (2005). 

21st-century American women
1926 births
2015 deaths
All-American Girls Professional Baseball League players
baseball players from Chicago
Chicago Colleens players